Vishka Nanak (also Romanized as Vīshkā Nanak; also known as Veshekha and Vīshkā) is a village in Sangar Rural District, Sangar District, Rasht County, Gilan Province, Iran. At the 2006 census, its population was 1,973, in 551 families.

References 

Populated places in Rasht County